Zánik samoty Berhof is a Czech novel, written by Vladimír Körner. It was first published in 1973.

1973 Czech novels